Ankalagi is a village in Gokak taluk, Belagavi district of Karnataka state in southern India. It is situated  about 15 miles south-west of Gokak and about 3 miles away from Suladhal railway station and is located on the bank of Markandeya river. It is a big village consisting of 64 small villages. Earlier, all this area was popularly known as "Kundara Nadu" and known for its freedom fighters - Deshpandes'. Ankalagi is also famous for the temple of Shri Adavi Siddeshwara. Surrounding villages include Akkatangerahal, Lagameshwar, Gujanal, Suladhal, Yaddalagudd, budihal  Hudali, Pachapur and many more. A weekly market is held on Friday where all village peoples gather and arrange the market.

Ankalagi is known for its Jain community. Ankalagi has the 80-year-old Sri Chandraprabhu Teerthankara Jain Temple which is built during the 1920s. Ankalagi is also known for business. Nearly all business is controlled by the Jain community including pharmaceuticals, steel, agribusiness, and retail shops. Ankalagi is also known for 30 number Beedi, Oil Mills,.

Bidi making is an important means of earning a living for the villagers. The pioneer in Bidi industry in the village was Tavanappa D Rajamane, a Jain entrepreneur in 1930s. Then the trend of Bidi Factories was developed by Dastagir Yargatti known as Yallur Dastagirsab  to provide occupations to the poor which later become a major business. He started some 12 brands of Bidis namely Vistu, Double Hatti & Dastagir Bidi etc. Later the city had other majors coming in to set up factories like Sinnar, Ganesh bidi etc.,

Ankalagi now has Shiroor Dam which has really helped with irrigation of farms. The main crops of Ankalagi are tobacco, sugar cane, cotton, soyabean, and vegetables. Ankalagi also has Keri Basavanna (Black Bull) temple which was famous in olden days.

Ankalagi has more than 10 schools. The village consists of a school named N S F High School Ankalagi "S A High School and S A English Medium School" Vidyaranya Convent school, which is renowned for its education, culture and discipline. Ankalagi has Ballari halla and streams surrounded by pashapuri bhaavi.

Ankalagi is famous for Shri Adavi Siddeshwara Matha fair held annually in the month of March for five days. A big cattle exhibition is also held along with the fair.

References

Villages in Belagavi district